Jean-Louis Burnouf (14 September 1775, in Urville, Manche – 8 May 1844) was a French philologist and translator.

The son of a poor weaver who died early in Burnouf's life, leaving him an orphan, he was admitted to the collège d'Harcourt in Paris on a scholarship and in 1792 won its Université prix d'honneur.  During the French Revolution, he made his living as a merchant.  Entering the Université in 1808, he was the professor of rhetoric at the lycée Charlemagne, and professor of Latin eloquence at the Collège de France, from 1817 to 1844, then inspector of the Université.  He was elected a member of the Académie des inscriptions et belles-lettres in 1836.

Jean Louis Burnouf wrote several translations of Latin authors : Sallust, Tacitus, Cicero, Pliny the Younger.  He also translated into Latin Antoine-Léonard Chézy's French version of the Yadjanadatta Badha (Sanskrit: Yadjnadatta Vadha, Killing of Yadjnadatta).

Burnouf was an early student of Sanskrit, which he studied under Alexander Hamilton. His son was Eugène Burnouf, and his great-nephew was Émile-Louis Burnouf, both scholars of Indian civilizations. He died aged 68.

Publications 
 Méthode pour étudier la langue grecque (1813–1814)
 Premiers principes de la grammaire grecque
 Méthode pour étudier la langue latine (1840–1841)
 Souvenirs de jeunesse, 1792-1796 (1888)

References 

1775 births
1844 deaths
French philologists
French translators
French orientalists
Members of the Académie des Inscriptions et Belles-Lettres
People from Manche
Academic staff of the Collège de France
French classical scholars
French male non-fiction writers